Annandale is a census-designated place (CDP) in Fairfax County, Virginia. The population of the CDP was 43,363 as of the 2020 United States Census. It is home to the oldest and largest branch of the Northern Virginia Community College system, and to one of the D.C. area's Koreatowns.

History
When Europeans arrived in the 17th century, the area around Annandale, which would become Fairfax County, was inhabited by an Algonquian-speaking sub-group called the Taux, also known as the Doeg or Dogue.  In 1685, an Englishman, Col. William H. Fitzhugh, purchased over 24,000 acres (37.5 square miles) of wilderness in the area and converted it into one of the largest tobacco plantations in Northern Virginia. It stretched from current day Fairfax City to Springfield and Falls Church and south to Pohick Church.  Fitzhugh’s descendants later named it "Ravensworth."  For over six generations, the Fitzhugh family farmed at Ravensworth and slowly sold off portions of the land.

In 1830 the community of Annandale was named by a Scottish settler, after the town named Annan located at the mouth of the River Annan. Annandale followed nearby Dumfries to become the second place in Dumfriesshire to become the name of a settlement in Virginia. In 1806, the Little River Turnpike (now Virginia State Route 236) had been completed through the community, connecting it with Alexandria and Fairfax.  In 1808, the Columbia Pike (now Virginia State Route 244) was built, connecting the District of Columbia with Little River Turnpike in what is now Annandale. The first businessman to locate in Annandale was William Garges, who built a blacksmith shop and a livery stable at the intersection of Columbia Pike, Little River Turnpike and Backlick Road, which would become the center of town. Garges became the first postmaster at the Annandale Post Office, which opened in 1837.  Small farms and businesses grew up around the town and its first church, the Annandale Methodist Chapel, was built in 1846.

The American Civil War touched Annandale several times between 1861 and 1865.  Union troops defending the vicinity of Washington, D.C., frequently took positions in and around the town.  Confederate forces probing those defenses skirmished with them from time to time.  The Methodist Chapel, which had fallen into disrepair during the war, was dismantled by Union troops to obtain construction materials in 1863.

After the war, farmers and businessmen returned to their pursuits and dairy farming began to grow in Fairfax County.  Small communities continued to develop or grow near railroad stations and the dairy farms. Residents would build stores, churches and schools for their communities.  By 1925, Fairfax County contained more dairy farms than any other county in Virginia.  In the 1930s and 1940s, work in the area for the federal government grew as President Franklin D. Roosevelt implemented the New Deal and the United States entered World War II.

After World War II, growth continued, with housing developments in suburbs like Annandale accompanied by businesses, schools, and roads to support the new residents.  The suburbs became “bedroom communities” with many residents commuting to work in Washington or surrounding small cities.  That trend has continued to today with further growth and many residents now commuting to work in Northern Virginia as well as in and around Washington.

Geography
Annandale is located at  (38.834134, −77.211277). Annandale is mostly traversed by the Capital Beltway (Interstate 495) and Little River Turnpike (Virginia State Route 236). The center of town is considered to be where Little River Turnpike, Columbia Pike, and Backlick Road meet, around two miles (3 km) east of Interstate 495 on Little River Turnpike.

Annandale is bordered to the north by West Falls Church, to the east by Lake Barcroft and Lincolnia, to the south by North Springfield, and to the west by Wakefield and Woodburn. The CDP border follows Braddock Road to the south, Interstate 495 to the west, Holmes Run and Arlington Boulevard (U.S. Route 50) to the north, and Sleepy Hollow Road, Columbia Pike, and Little River Turnpike to the east.

The area is part of the coastal plain located just east of the Fall Line separating the coastal plain of Virginia from the Piedmont. It is characterized by rolling hills, stream valleys, and heavy red clay soils.

The Annandale region is bisected by Accotink Creek, which in Colonial times was a primary link for ocean-going ships that would load tobacco and other goods where Little River Turnpike - Annandale's oldest road and the first toll road in America - crosses it. With the construction of the Springfield Dam in 1918, Lake Accotink was created to serve as a water source for World War I-era Army Camp A.A. Humphreys (now named Fort Belvoir). In 1960, when the lake was no longer needed by the Army, the Fairfax County Park Authority leased the land and finally bought the site in 1965. Today, Lake Accotink is a popular recreation area with walking, hiking and biking trails, fishing and boat rentals.

The trail meanders through parks and forests filled with deer, fox, geese and numerous species of native birds. In the spring, Accotink Creek is stocked with trout, and fishermen are often seen wading in its waters.

Demographics

As of the 2020 census, there were 43,363 people, 13,882 households, and 9,455 families residing in the community. The sharp decrease in population from 54,994 in 2000 was due to the splitting off of the CDP's western portion to form the Wakefield and Woodburn CDPs. The population density in 2020 was 5,516.9 people per square mile (2,130.1/km2). The racial makeup of the community was 44.7%  White, 21.9% Asian, 9.0% Black, 0.8% American Indian, 0.3% Pacific Islander, 18.8% from other races, and 4.5% from two or more races. Hispanics and Latinos of any race were 32.1% of the population. Annandale is home to a large working-class White community, and is one of the few remaining areas in Fairfax County where the group has a notable presence. 

There were 13,882 households, out of which 31.2% had children under the age of 18 living with them, 48.7% were married couples living together, 13.7% had a female householder with no husband present, and 31.9% were non-families. 22.9% of all households were made up of individuals, and 10.9% had someone living alone who was 65 years of age or older. The average household size was 3.09, and the average family size was 3.55.

The age distribution of the community was 22.0% under the age of 18, 9.7% from 18 to 24, 30.2% from 25 to 44, 25.4% from 45 to 64, and 13.8% who were 65 years of age or older. The median age was 37.3 years. The gender makeup of the community was 49.6% male and 50.4% female.

The median income for a household in the community was $96,533, and the median income for a family was $108,079. Males had median earnings of $42,552 versus $30,979 for females. The community's per capita income was $40,361. About 6.9% of families and 9.8% of the population were below the poverty line, including 14.6% of those under age 18 and 9.0% of those age 65 or over.

According to the Demographic Statistical Atlas of the United States, as of 2018, the largest ancestry groups were:

 9.5% Salvadoran
 9.0% African-American
 8.9% Vietnamese
 9.1% Bolivian
 6.8% German
 6.2% Korean
 5.8% Irish
 4.8% English
 3.0% Guatemalan
 3.0% Italian
 2.8% Honduran
 2.8% American
 2.7% Arab
 2.4% Filipino
 2.1% Chinese
 1.9% Pakistani
 1.6% Mexican
 1.4% Polish
 1.2% Indian
 1.2% Peruvian
 1.1% Scottish

Economy

Corporate presence
 DynCorp Headquarters (uses a Mclean, Virginia postal address)
 Noblis Headquarters (uses a Reston, Virginia postal address)
 Former
 Ensco Headquarters (used a Falls Church, Virginia postal address)

Koreatown

Downtown Annandale is also referred to by some as Koreatown as there were roughly 929 South Korean-owned businesses as of 2006 and 67 South Korean-owned restaurants as of July 1, 2010, operating in the Washington Metropolitan Area, according to the GIANT Directory for South Korean-owned and Korean-American businesses. They were developed beginning in the 1990s by Korean immigrants to the region. The influx of Koreans to Northern Virginia and Annandale can be traced to the ease of commute into the District of Columbia for federal employees, the quality of its schools, and even the opening of an office of the Fairfax County Economic Development Authority in Seoul. Most of the businesses and restaurants initially catered primarily to South Korean expatriates, but some had a diverse clientele from the beginning. In the past, county officials sought to make Annandale more diverse by encouraging Korean businesses to include English in their signs. Today, Fairfax County is home to nearly 40,000 Koreans and is seen by many Washingtonians as a destination for karaoke, BBQ, and bingsu.  There are now multiple generations of Korean-American businesses and restaurants in Annandale and they attract a broad demographic of customers.

Local government

Fairfax County (which includes Annandale) operates under the urban county executive form of government. The powers of government are vested in an elected Board of Supervisors consisting of nine members elected by district, plus a Chairman elected at large. The Annandale CDP lies almost entirely within the Mason District, with one small portion to the southwest lying within the Braddock District.

Education

Public schools

Educational institutions in Annandale include facilities operated by the Fairfax County Public Schools. Annandale High School, founded in 1954, is the main area public high school although Thomas Jefferson High School for Science and Technology, Falls Church High School, Woodson High School, and Justice High School also take in small portions of Annandale. Other schools include Edgar Allan Poe Middle School, Annandale Terrace Elementary School, Braddock Elementary School, Belvedere Elementary School, Glasgow Middle School, Woodburn Elementary School, Camelot Elementary School, Columbia Elementary School, Canterbury Woods Elementary School (Wakefield CDP), and Wakefield Forest Elementary School.

Annandale High School has one of the area's few International Baccalaureate Degree programs. Ensembles within the school's choral program have performed at the Kennedy Center in Washington, D.C., as well as many European venues.

Private schools
Private Catholic schools in the Annandale area, of the Roman Catholic Diocese of Arlington, include Holy Spirit Catholic School (Wakefield CDP), St. Ambrose Catholic School, and St. Michael's Catholic School.

Private schools located in Annandale include Grasshopper Green, Kenwood School, Hope Montessori School, Montessori School of Northern Virginia, Oakwood School, Pinecrest School, and Westminster School.

Colleges and universities
The oldest and largest branch of the Northern Virginia Community College system is also located within Annandale and was founded in 1965. A focal point of "NOVA", a commonly used nickname of the community college, is the Richard J. Ernst Community Cultural Center which is a  facility containing a 525-seat, state-of-the-art theater with satellite downlink and video projection capability, an  gymnasium/exhibition hall, a light-filled atrium entrance and a two-story art gallery. The college opened with 761 students, and today has more than 75,000 students and 2,600 faculty and staff members, and has six permanent campus sites across Northern Virginia. The student body consists of people from more than 180 countries.

As of the 2010 U.S. Census the U.S. Census Bureau defines the campus, which has an Annandale postal address, as being in the Wakefield CDP. The bureau defined the campus as being in the Annandale CDP for the 1990 U.S. Census and the 2000 U.S. Census, but in 2010 separated the area with the NVCC campus into a new CDP.

Public services

Fire department

The Fairfax County Fire & Rescue department staffs two stations in Annandale; downtown at Station 8, and in West Annandale, at Station 23, that operate within Annandale and surrounding areas within and around the county when needed. The Annandale Volunteer Fire Department (AVFD), a non-profit organization started in 1940, owns and maintains stations 8 and 23.  Through a partnership with Fairfax County, both stations are now staffed full-time with career personnel employed by Fairfax County. Volunteers also provide regular emergency services at both stations. Vehicles owned by AVFD display "Annandale Volunteer Fire Department" markings and include Medic 408, Medic 408B, Ambulance 408, Engine 408, Canteen 408, & Medic 423.  Engine 423, Light and Air 423, Tower 408 and BC404 are owned by Fairfax County and marked as such. However, all vehicles have some type of "Annandale" on the exterior.

Public libraries

Fairfax County Public Library operates the George Mason Regional Library in the CDP.

Recreational centers
The REC center offers more than 40 group fitness classes each week.

Parks

Annandale has parks scattered across its geographical region and a number of them are maintained by the Fairfax County Park Authority. The following parks are located in Annandale: Mason District Park, The Wakefield Chapel Park, Turkeycock Run Stream Valley Park, Annandale Community Park, Ossian Hall Park, Kendale Woods Park, Mill Creek Park, Wilburdale Park, Broyhill Crest Park, Larchmont Park, Canterbury Woods Park, Hidden Oaks Nature Center (Fairfax County Government Park Authority), Pine Ridge High School Site Park, Camelot School Site Park, Oak Hill Park, Backlick Park, Willow Woods Park, Valley Crest Park, Long Branch Falls Park, Manassas Gap Park, Fairfax Hills Park, Masonville Park, Howery Field Park, Poe Terrace Park, Rose Lane Park, Indian Run Stream Valley Park, and Accotink Stream Valley Park.

The Wakefield Skate Park is also located within Wakefield Park (now in the Wakefield CDP). The skate park also offers skateboarding, BMX classes and camps for children of all ages and skills.

Notable people

Notable individuals who were born in and/or have lived in Annandale include actor Mark Hamill; country music performer Kelly Willis;  actor Dylan Walsh; Christopher McCandless, the subject of author Jon Krakauer's 1996 book, Into the Wild; and Fawn Hall, a notable figure in the Iran-Contra affair. Soccer goalkeeper Bill Hamid is from Annandale.

In popular culture
In the video game Fallout 3, the city is used as a location under the name of Andale. The city is inhabited by a group of inbred cannibals who proudly go by the title of the "Friendliest Town in the USA".

In 2016, a contentious video posted onto YouTube in 2014 about Annandale, Virginia resurfaced and reached over a million views after the creator, named Angelo Mike, posted it onto Reddit himself. In the video, Mike claims that Annandale is a "funnel for the dregs of society" and points out its flaws with "striking images of filth, ruin, and a dead rat". Although his intention was to create a lighthearted video in which Annandale residents could make fun of the city with him, he has received criticism for misrepresenting the Washington, D.C. suburb.

See also

 Flag of Annandale, Virginia

References

Further reading

External links

 
 Annandale Chamber of Commerce
 Flag of Annandale
 The Washington Posts Guide to Annandale, VA

 
1685 establishments in Virginia
Census-designated places in Fairfax County, Virginia
Census-designated places in Virginia
Koreatowns in the United States
Populated places established in 1685
Washington metropolitan area